This is a List of Local Government Districts in the South East England government region, in descending order of population.

This table does not distinguish between non-metropolitan districts, unitary authorities and cities. It is not a table of urban populations, as many districts include non-urban hinterlands.

See also 
List of urban areas in England by population
List of English counties by population
List of ceremonial counties of England by population
List of English districts by area
List of English districts and their ethnic composition
List of English districts by population density
List of English districts by population

References

South East England
Demographics of England
Districts of England
Districts by population